Matteo Draperi (born 17 January 1991) is an Italian road bicycle racer, who currently rides for French amateur squad Team Cycliste Azuréen.

Career
Up through the junior category, Draperi was one of the leading cyclists in his country, finishing second in the national road championship twice, as well as a two-time winner of the challenge “Oscar tuttoBICI”.
He began the U23 category with physical pain, and underwent a surgical operation to the vertebral column. Because of this problem, he had few results in this category.

Major results
2008
 2nd Overall Tre Ciclistica Internazionale Bresciana 
1st Young rider classification
 5th Overall Giro della Toscana
2009
 8th Overall 3 Giorni Orobica
 10th Trofeo Emilio Paganessi
2018
 8th GP Izola
 10th Overall Belgrade Banjaluka

References

External links

1991 births
Living people
Italian male cyclists
People from Cuneo
Cyclists from Piedmont
Sportspeople from the Province of Cuneo